Count Francis Rhédey de Kis-Rhéde (c. 1610 – 13 May 1667) was a Hungarian noble, who reigned as Prince of Transylvania between November 1657 and January 1658.

Biography 
He was born as the son of Count Francis Rhédey de Kis-Rhéde (1660-1621) and his wife, Katalin Karolyi (1588-1635), widow of István Bánffy de Losonc and future wife of Stefan Bethlen de Iktár, Prince of Transilvania.
As a high-ranking nobleman he served in the Transylvanian army for several years as deputy commander in the service of Prince George II Rákóczi.

Francisco Rhédey was elected Prince of Transylvania for a brief time while George Rákóczi was on a military campaign in Poland. Very upset because Rákóczi had not requested authorization from the sultan to start the military campaign, the Grand Vizier Köprülü Mehmed Pasha, forced the Grand Assembly to elect Francis Rhédey prince of Transylvania instead of Rákóczi. Soon Rhédey was officially elected as Transylvanian Prince on 2 November 1657, but on 9 January 1658 he resigned in favor of George Rákóczi II, who had returned to Transylvania.

Rhédey later was a member of the Great Council during the government of Prince Michael I Apafi. He died on 13 May 1667.

Personal life 
He was married to Druzsiána Bethlen de Iktár, daughter of his stepfather, Prince Stefan by his first wife, Katalin Csáki de Mihály. They had one son, Count László Rhédey de Kis-Rhéde (1636-1663).

References

1610 births
1667 deaths
Year of birth uncertain
Francis
Monarchs of Transylvania
People from Oradea
17th-century Hungarian people